Bolsonaro is a surname originating from the northeastern Italian region of Veneto, where it is spelt Bolzonaro. The phonetic spelling of Bolsonaro is used by the branch of the family that migrated to Brazil in the late 19th century.

Notable people with the surname include:

Carlos Bolsonaro (born 1982), Brazilian politician, Jair Bolsonaro's son, 
Eduardo Bolsonaro (born 1984), Brazilian lawyer, federal police officer and politician; Jair Bolsonaro's son
Flávio Bolsonaro (born 1981), Brazilian lawyer, entrepreneur and politician; Jair Bolsonaro's son
Jair Bolsonaro (born 1955), 38th President of Brazil
Michelle Bolsonaro (born 1980), former First Lady of Brazil, Jair Bolsonaro's wife
Valéria Bolsonaro (born 1969), Brazilian politician
Renan Bolsonaro (born 1998), Jair Bolsonaro's son

References

Italian-language surnames